SS Dwight L. Moody was a Liberty ship built in the United States during World War II. She was named after Dwight L. Moody, evangelist, publisher, the founder of the Moody Church, Northfield School and Mount Hermon School in Massachusetts, now Northfield Mount Hermon School, the Moody Bible Institute, and Moody Publishers.

Construction
Dwight L. Moody was laid down on 4 March 1943, under a Maritime Commission (MARCOM) contract, MC hull 1526, by J.A. Jones Construction, Panama City, Florida; she was launched on 28 June 1943.

History
She was allocated to Lykes Bros. Steamship Co., Inc., on 24 July 1943. On 29 May 1946, she was laid up in the National Defense Reserve Fleet, in the James River Group. On 23 January 1950, she was laid up in the National Defense Reserve Fleet, in Beaumont, Texas. On 1 July 1975, she was turned over to the state of Texas, for use as an artificial reef. She was removed from the fleet on 9 July 1975.

References

Bibliography

 
 
 
 
 

 

Liberty ships
Ships built in Panama City, Florida
1943 ships
James River Reserve Fleet
Beaumont Reserve Fleet
Ships sunk as artificial reefs
Maritime incidents in 1976